Oreoleysera is a genus of South African flowering plants in the pussy's-toes tribe within the sunflower family.

Species
The only known species is Oreoleysera montana, native to South Africa.

References

Gnaphalieae
Monotypic Asteraceae genera
Flora of South Africa